Erik Killmonger (né N'Jadaka) is a supervillain appearing in American comic books published by Marvel Comics. Created by Don McGregor and Rich Buckler, he first appeared in Jungle Action #6 (September 1973). The character is commonly depicted as a skilled hunter and mercenary born in the fictional African nation of Wakanda, who holds a grudge against the country and its people after his biological parents were killed when he was young. Raised outside of Wakanda, he eventually returns as a revolutionary leader and terrorist to exact his revenge, and repeatedly challenges the nation's king and protector, Black Panther, who becomes his most prominent adversary.

The character has been adapted from the comics into several other forms of media, such as television series and video games. Michael B. Jordan portrayed the character in the Marvel Cinematic Universe films Black Panther (2018) and Black Panther: Wakanda Forever (2022), and later voiced an alternate reality version in the animated series What If...? (2021).

Publication history
Erik Killmonger first appeared in the "Panther's Rage" storyline, initially in Jungle Action #6-8 (September 1973 - January 1974), and was created by writer Don McGregor and penciler Rich Buckler.

Fictional character biography
Native born of Wakanda, Erik was born under the name "N'Jadaka." His parents were killed by raiders led by a traitorous citizen of the Golden Realm who sold out secrets of his home nation to Ulysses Klaue.

He was taken and raised abroad by his hateful caretakers, and given a new name and identity by those who had robbed him of paradise. N'Jadaka was a gifted intellectual from an early age. This trait was exploited by his surrogate father M'Demwe, the very same who murdered his family before taking him into the outside world, all while boasting of national superiority as they trekked foreign lands.

All the while, N'Jadaka fostered a deep resentment towards everyone and everything for all the horrible events that befell him, while his future nemesis T'Challa would be crowned king after the death of his father.

Eventually, the youth tired of his life in servitude and his childhood of hardship, and executed M'Demwe, brutally shooting, then stabbing the traitor to death, before striving to find his own path. He later changed his name to Erik Killmonger, and studied at Massachusetts Institute of Technology, still desperate to avenge his father's death.

While studying in Harlem, New York, Erik attempted multiple times to murder the source of his woes, but was confounded by supervillainous power players working under the likes of Wilson Fisk/Kingpin.

That mercenary outfit of mutants took Killmonger on as a temporary member within their crew of hired guns. Eventually he fell in love with a teammate, Knight, and found temporary solace in her company, while taking odd jobs under the lord of crime in New York. All of that eventually fell apart when their employer sold them out to his top operator Bullseye. His love interest, Knight, subsequently cut a deal with S.H.I.E.L.D. behind the backs of what remained of the team so she could get an easy out from her life of crime.

Killmonger would eventually embrace his chosen name, as well as a new goddess named K'liluna, fallen sister of Mother Bast, when he exacted revenge upon his scorned lover before disappearing into obscurity for a time.

Return Home
Killmonger returned to Wakanda after king T'Challa brought their homeland to the attentions of the outside world. The two would converse about Wakandan theology while asking about the deity whom Erik was secretly living with, all whilst plotting his revenge against his liege, and the nation he blamed for his abandonment to the corruption beyond it. While re-acquainting himself with the land that left him behind, N'Jadaka would discover plans for a WMD called Project: Koukou, a deadly vibranium shock bomb meant to act as a colonizer deterrent. He then set about systematically killing other Wakandan refugees as an effective misdirection ploy so as to foment his plans for global conflict.

Killmonger's ultimate aim was to drop Koukou on a S.H.I.E.L.D. Helicarrier coming in for diplomatic treaties, framing the hidden nation as aggressors on the world stage, and forcing them to go to war with everyone else, thus; allowing Killmonger to overthrow T'Challa and lead his people to storm over the world in a genocidal crusade. When Shuri trapped him in an invention, instead of being arrested, he jumped from a plane into a lake, where he was believed to have survived.

What became of Killmonger afterward is a mystery. He would eventually settle in a kingdom-based hamlet that would later change its name to N'Jadaka Village in his honor. He became a subversive, with dreams of ridding Wakanda of what he termed "white colonialist" cultural influences, and return it entirely to its ancient ways. He then took advantage of Black Panther's frequent absences in America with the Avengers to stage a coup d'état, along with Baron Macabre. He was defeated and killed, until the Mandarin claimed his body.

Resurrection
Using the Ten Rings, the Mandarin was able to amplify the resurrection altar and restore Killmonger to life. Killmonger returned to his lover and ally, Madam Slay, and the two plotted to kill the Black Panther and return Wakanda to its ancient ways. While Tony Stark visited Wakanda, Madam Slay drugged James Rhodes and took him prisoner. Killmonger appeared to have killed Black Panther, and blamed Rhodes and Stark, convincing the Wakandans that he could lead them to vengeance. Black Panther returned, revealing that he had faked his death using a life model decoy. Black Panther defeated Killmonger. The Mandarin recalled his ring and Killmonger reverted to an inanimate skeleton. Killmonger's followers resurrected him again and he would clash with T'Challa on several other occasions.

Wakanda takeover
In the wake of the sorcerer Reverend Achebe's attempted takeover of Wakanda, with T'Challa absent and control of the country left with his regent Everett Ross, Killmonger tried to gain control of the country via its economy, forcing T'Challa to stop him by nationalizing all foreign companies in Wakanda and cause a run on the stock market. The two foes fought in a vicious ritual combat over the right to rule the country, and Killmonger was finally able to defeat his foe and gain the status of Black Panther for his own. He maintained control of Wakanda for a while and even attempted to inherit T'Challa's Avengers status, but when he underwent the ascension rite needed to cement his position, his body had a severe reaction to the heart-shaped herb that he was required to consume - it was poisonous to all but the royal bloodline. Although it would have been convenient to allow him to die and be unquestionably entitled to the position of Black Panther, T'Challa preserved his rival's life.

Killmonger eventually came out of his coma, thus; reclaiming his position as chieftain over Wakanda. He went to New York and contacted Kasper Cole, an inner-city police officer masquerading as Black Panther to help him with cases, and attempted to gain him as an ally (and one-up T'Challa) by offering him a buffered version of Black Panther's heart-shaped herb and help finding his supervisor's kidnapped son. In exchange, he had to drop the identity of Black Panther and take up that of a White Tiger acolyte of the Panther cult, and would owe Killmonger a favor. While Kasper agreed to this, he then used his new herb-enhanced powers to track down the boy on his own to avoid owing Killmonger an unpayable debt.

T'Challa is then once again the sole ruler of Wakanda when Killmonger resurfaces and takes control of the neighboring country of Niganda. During a subsequent duel with T'Challa, Killmonger is killed by Monica Rambeau, whom he had previously captured and imprisoned. Killmonger's young son is last seen swearing vengeance against Black Panther, much like N'Jadaka had done years earlier after the death of his own father.

Post–Secret Wars 
After the vast Multiversal reboot of Marvel, Killmonger would once again be resurrected by an intergalactic superpower based upon Wakanda's cultural heritage; one that lacked its more pacifistic approach to handling different races and ethnicities. A leading ruler of said empire which had conquered five galaxies while taking up his name sought to supplant the original N'Jadaka's body so as to overtake the Wakanda of now in revenge on the king of the future for killing him. But the symbiote withholding the emperor's soul had overshot his attempt at finding a new host, resurrecting the original holder of his name, who then fought with the emperor over control of their shared body. The parasitic entity threatened to cast Killmonger back unto death should he disobey him, while the precursor to the galactic overlord promising to master and supplant it in response.

Powers and abilities
Erik Killmonger is an expert martial artist with peak-level strength and a genius-level intellect. He is also an expert tactician, having taken over Wakanda and Niganda multiple times. Erik is capable of taking attacks from stronger foes and falls from great heights that would kill or injure a normal person with little to no injury (he still can be hurt or killed if enough damage is sustained). He is highly knowledgeable of Wakanda/African history and laws, leading to him battling Black Panther constantly for the throne. It is also strongly implied that he cannot consume the Heart-Shaped Herb to gain the same abilities of the Black Panther due to his not having the royal bloodline. He is also a skilled businessman.

Reception
 In 2018, Comicbook.com ranked Erik Killmonger 1st in their "8 Best Black Panther Villains" list.
 In 2020, CBR.com ranked Killmonger 1st in their "Marvel: Ranking Black Panther's Rogues Gallery" list.
 In 2022, Screen Rant included Killmonger in their "15 Most Powerful Black Panther Villains" list.
 In 2022, CBR.com ranked Killmonger 4th in their "10 Most Iconic Black Panther Villains" list.

Other versions

X-Men Forever
In an alternate timeline depicted in X-Men Forever, Killmonger made a pact with an evil version of Storm to kill T'Challa, which they succeeded in doing. However, Storm later betrayed and killed Killmonger so she could be seen as a hero to the Wakandans and become the Queen of Wakanda.

Once and Future King
In an alternate universe listed as Earth-11236, Killmonger and his cabal kidnapped T'Challa's friend, Everett Ross, in order to make T'Challa himself come out of isolation. However, he, his cabal, and T'Challa's daughter were all killed by T'Charra, T'Challa's son.

Infinity Wars
During the Infinity Wars, when the universe was folded in half, Killmonger was fused with Killraven, forming Erik Killraven. In a possible future, where the Martians had invaded Earth, Erik along with his family, who had been exiled from Wakanda, were captured and experimented on by the Martians. Erik along with M'Bakshulla (a fusion of Man-Ape and M'Shulla Scott) escaped the Martians and stole Time Diamonds, which they used to travel back in time and weaken Wakanda so it would fall with the rest of the world during the Martian invasion. In fact, they were successful in killing T'Chaka and destroying the heart-shaped herb. They eventually confronted Ghost Panther (a fusion between Black Panther and Ghost Rider), with the latter killing M'Bakshulla. Erik retaliated by impaling him from behind and planting bombs around Wakanda. However Ghost Panther came back and along with his resurrected father, consumed Killraven's soul.

Intergalactic Empire of Wakandas
In an alternate timeline set 2000 years in the distant past, a man named after Killmonger's real name, N'Jadaka, became a hero of the empire after retrieving the Shard of M'Kraan during the war against the Shi'ar Empire. However, the current ruler of Wakanda feared that N'Jadaka would overthrow him, so he sent N'Jadaka along with his squad on a secret suicide mission to take the Matrix of the Mamadou galaxy, which was inhabited by the Kronans, Shadow People, and the Klyntar. Upon arriving on a planet in the galaxy, they were quickly attacked by a race known as the Between. Trying to survive, he came across a member of the Klyntar race and bonded with it, since they had a mutual hatred against the current emperor, who made the Klyntar an endangered species. Upon defeating the Between, N'Jadaka and the symbiote killed the emperor and took the throne as the new emperor of the Intergalactic Empire of Wakanda. During this time, he got married and conceived a daughter. Upon finding out that T'Challa from the future had arrived in his present, he feared that T'Challa would join the Maroon rebels, so he had him become a member of the Nameless, slaves who had their memories wiped and were forced to mine for Vibranium on asteroids. However, T'Challa retained his memories of Storm and managed to escape to join the Maroon's regardless. After that, N'Jadaka approached Bast and after recounting his origin, battled Bast's avatar. He was successful in killing it and making his daughter the new Avatar of Bast. After the Maroons got ahold of N'Jadaka's daughter and T'Challa had visited the planet of the Between, N'Jadaka with his army went after the rebels in order to get his daughter back. However, Bast betrayed him and made his Empire fighters crash into the mothership while a rebel commander set the planet holding the rebel base's core to explode as a last ditch attempt to stop him; resulting in the sacrifice of thousands of lives and the apparent death of N'Jadaka.

King Killmonger
A version of Killmonger appears as a member of the Multiversal Masters of Evil under the name of King Killmonger. He wears armor that resembles the Destroyer laced with Vibranium and was responsible for conquering Wakanda and Asgard. They went around attacking Prehistoric Avengers on alternate Earths and conquering them. King Killmonger accompanied Dark Phoenix and her Berserkers (consisting of Hound and a Thor from an unidentified Earth) in attacking Asgard which brought them into conflict with Thor, Echo, and Iron Man. After the alternate Thor was killed by Thor, King Killmonger, Dark Phoenix, and Hound got away. They alongside the rest of the Multiversal Masters of Evil left Earth-616 to get back to work.

King Killmonger's actions have earned him the wrath of an alternate T'Challa who operated as Sky Spider and later operated as Vibranium Man. By the time Vibranium Man caught up to King Killmonger, he fought him as King Killmonger claimed that his armor was forged by the gods that fell before his axe. King Killmonger throws Vibranium Man off his ship quoting "Wakanda Nevermore".

King Killmonger was with the Multiversal Masters of Evil when they took over another Earth and planned to return to Earth-616. Just then, Ghost Rider arrives where he controls Black Skull's symbiote to subdue King Killmonger. After the Deathlok that was Ghost Rider's companion buys Ant-Man of Earth-818 time to get away, King Killmonger and the rest of the Multiversal Masters of Evil are told by Doctor Doom that they need to regroup as he knows where they are going. They will make one final stop before they return to Earth-616 as Doom Supreme tells the Multiversal Masters of Evil that "no Avenger gets out alive".

As the Multiversal Masters of Evil face off against the Avengers and the Prehistoric Avengers, King Killmonger faces off against Thor and Agamotto. The battle lasted for days. During his fight with Iron Man, King Killmonger was killed by the Prehistoric Iron Fist.

In other media

Television
 Erik Killmonger appears in Lego Marvel Super Heroes: Black Panther - Trouble in Wakanda, voiced by Keston John.
 Erik Killmonger appears in Avengers Assemble, voiced again by Keston John. This version is the leader of the Shadow Council and T'Challa's teacher. In the two-part episode "Shadow of Atlantis", Killmonger secretly hires Tiger Shark to break into the Wakandan Embassy and steal a jar containing a seal with the crest of the Wakandan Royal Family. While escaping with the seal, Tiger Shark contacts Killmonger for an extraction, but the latter turns him down due to the Avengers pursuing the former. In the episode "Into the Deep", Killmonger becomes the ambassador of Wakanda while visiting Atlantis alongside T'Challa and Shuri in an attempt to secretly free Tiger Shark. Revealing his true colors to everyone present however, Killmonger detonates depth charges surrounding Atlantis while he and Tiger Shark escape.

Marvel Cinematic Universe
Killmonger appears in media set in the Marvel Cinematic Universe (MCU), portrayed by Michael B. Jordan. This version is an American black-ops soldier named Erik Stevens whose "Killmonger" nickname came from his military career. Moreover, rather than a Wakandan exile, he is the son of Prince N'Jobu and an American woman from Oakland, California and his chest is covered with self-inflicted scarification dots that represent each of his confirmed kills. In addition, Killmonger sports battle armor that bears a resemblance to that of Vegeta from the anime series Dragon Ball Z, of which Jordan is a fan. Jordan's performance as Killmonger received critical acclaim, and the character was widely hailed as one of the best villains in the MCU.
 Killmonger first appears in the live-action film Black Panther. Seeking revenge for his father's death and angry at Wakanda's refusal to assist disenfranchised individuals of African descent around the globe, he challenges his cousin T'Challa for his birthright to the throne and seemingly kills him. After becoming king of Wakanda and consuming the Heart-Shaped Herb to gain powers, Killmonger orders the country's high-tech weapons be sent to marginalized groups in London, New York City, and Hong Kong to help oppressed people rise up and overthrow their governments. He dons a version of T'Challa's kinetic energy absorbing suit, but T'Challa returns to reclaim the throne and mortally wounds Killmonger in their resulting rematch. Though he is offered treatment, Killmonger chooses to die rather than be imprisoned.
 An alternate timeline version of Killmonger appears in the Disney+ animated series, What If...?, with Jordan reprising the role. In the episode "What If... Killmonger Rescued Tony Stark?", he rescues and befriends Tony Stark to gain his help in building an automated combat drone out of Vibranium before arranging the deaths of T'Challa, James Rhodes, and Stark to convince the United States military to build an army of combat drones and spark conflict between the United States and Wakanda. After returning to Wakanda and revealing his true heritage, Killmonger works with Wakanda's forces to defeat the drone army and eventually become the new Black Panther. In the first-season finale, "What If... the Watcher Broke His Oath?", Killmonger is recruited by the Watcher to join the Guardians of the Multiverse and help stop a variant of Ultron empowered by Infinity Stones from destroying the multiverse. Following Ultron's defeat, Killmonger betrays the Guardians and takes the Stones for himself, hoping to use them to fix his universe. While he is attacked by Arnim Zola in Ultron's body, who also seeks the Stones, both are frozen in a pocket dimension by the Watcher and Doctor Strange Supreme, with the latter subsequently taking the pair back to his native universe to guard them for the rest of eternity.
 Killmonger's spirit makes a cameo appearance in the live-action film Black Panther: Wakanda Forever. Shuri consumes a synthetic heart-shaped herb and goes into a trance in the hopes of communing with her lost loved ones. Instead, she sees Killmonger, who explains that they are meeting because her heart is tainted with a similar need for vengeance. Though he praises her for her attempts to protect Riri Williams, he goads her into giving in to her desire to seek revenge on Namor.

Video games
 Erik Killmonger appears as an unlockable playable character in Lego Marvel's Avengers, as part of the "Classic Black Panther" DLC Pack.
 Erik Killmonger appears as an unlockable playable character in Lego Marvel Super Heroes 2, voiced by Damian Lynch. He is available through the "Marvel's Black Panther Movie Character and Level Pack" DLC.
 Erik Killmonger appears as an unlockable playable character in Marvel Future Fight.
 Erik Killmonger appears as an unlockable playable character in Marvel Contest of Champions.

Music
Erik Killmonger is referenced in the song "King's Dead" by rappers Jay Rock, Kendrick Lamar, and Future, from the 2018 Black Panther film's soundtrack.

References

External links
 
 Erik Killmonger at Comic Vine
 World of Black Heroes: Killmonger Biography
 
 

Action film villains
Black characters in films
Characters created by Don McGregor
Comics characters introduced in 1973
Fictional dictators
Fictional kings
Fictional mass murderers
Fictional revolutionaries
Fictional terrorists
Film supervillains
Male characters in film
Marvel Comics characters who can move at superhuman speeds
Marvel Comics characters with superhuman strength
Marvel Comics film characters
Marvel Comics male supervillains
Marvel Comics martial artists
Wakandans